AIR Manjeri FM 102.7 is an FM radio station located in Manjeri, operated by All India Radio. It broadcasts programs varying from news to entertainment and its broadcast area covers the Malappuram district, major parts of Kozhikode, Wayanad, Palakkad, some areas of Thrissur and the Nilgiris district of Tamil Nadu. According to the statistics of All India Radio, there are approximately 80 lakh listeners.

History
It was inaugurated on 28.1.2006 by former Minister of State for External Affairs, E. Ahammed. D. Pradeep Kumar was the first Programme Executive. First transmission executive was Mathew Joseph and first announcer was R. Kanakambaran.

Broadcast timings
The station broadcasts programs without break from 05.53 a.m to 11.22 p.m.Till 25.1.2017, transmission was  restricted from 3.55 p.m to 10 p.m. On 26 January 2017, as part of celebrating the 11th anniversary of launch, station started morning broadcast from 6.30 a.m to 1.20 p.m In 2019, it was announced that station will start a 17-hour continuous transmission from 5.53 a.m to 11.06 p.m without break. Thus, from 2 June onwards, it became the first and only AIR station in Kerala to have continuous transmission.

See more
List of Malayalam-language radio stations
Vividh Bharati

References

External links
 

Radio stations in Kerala
All India Radio